Erika Giovanna Klien (12 April 1900 – 19 July 1957) was an artist and art educator.

Career
Erika Giovanna Klien was born April 12, 1900 in Borgo Valsugana, Trentino, Italy. She began her studies at the Vienna School of Applied Arts, also known as Kunstgewerbeschule Wien in Vienna, Austria in 1919 and graduated in 1925. A student of Dr. Franz Cižek, Klien became one of his teaching assistants. In Cižek's course, "Theory of Ornamental Form", Klien was introduced to a new style known as Viennese Kinetism – a style that emphasized movement and modern vitality, in a way similar to French Cubism, Italian Futurism and Russian Constructivism. After learning about the technique and theories of Kinetism, Klien became one of its leading exponents. After graduation, Klien found it difficult, as did many women, to earn a living as an independent artist. She worked as a commercial graphic artist and taught at the Elizabeth Duncan School, at Klessheim near Salzburg, from 1926 to 1928. 

Klien's work was included in several international exhibitions, such as the Paris Decorative Arts Exhibition of 1925, the Armory Show in New York City in 1927 and the Fourth International Congress of Art Education in Prague in 1928.

In 1928 Klien had a son, whom she kept secret from her family. In 1929 Klien sailed for the United States, bringing with her hopes for an artistic career and the reform theories of children's art education she had acquired in Vienna. To earn a living for herself and her son, she taught simultaneously at four institutions from 1930 to 1940 – the New York’s Stuyvesant High School, Spence School, Dalton School and the Walt Whitman High School (New York).

Klien became a U. S. citizen in 1938. She died on 19 July 1957 from a heart attack in New York City.

Klien's son Walter Klien became a pianist. He died in 1991.

Exhibitions 
1930: The New School for Social Research, New York
1975: Galerie Pabst, Vienna
1986: Retrospective at Gallery Pabst, Munich
1987: Museum des XX. Jahrhunderts (Museum of the 20th Century), Vienna (250 works)
1989: Rachel Adler Gallery, New York
2001: Bolzano
2006: Société Anonyme at the Hammer, reviewed in The Aesthetic
Permanently: Phillips Collection Art Museum in Washington, DC.

References

1900 births
1957 deaths
People from Borgo Valsugana
Modern painters
Landscape artists
Artists from New York (state)
American women painters
20th-century American painters
20th-century American women artists
20th-century Italian painters
20th-century Italian women artists